Epps-Mcgill Farmhouse is a two-story Folk Victorian style home located near Kingstree, in Williamsburg County, South Carolina. Construction of the home began in 1905 by Silas Wightman Epps. It was listed on the National Register of Historic Places in 2020.

Description
The Epps-Mcgill Farmhouse was the residence for multiple generations of farmers that worked in field surrounding the property, which was originally  in size. The farmhouse is known for is high level of architectural integrity, with little changes being made during its existence, and for its unique ownership as a rare instance of success in the sharecropping system of the American South when purchased by African American farmer Weaver McGill in 1976.

See Also
National Register of Historic Places listings in Williamsburg County, South Carolina

References 

1907 establishments
National Register of Historic Places in Williamsburg County, South Carolina
Houses on the National Register of Historic Places in South Carolina